
Rockfort, located east of Kingston, Jamaica, in an area previously known as Harbour Head, is the ruins of a 17th century rock fort that was once surrounded by a moat. First the site of a British rock fort, it was fortified in 1694 to protect the eastern edge of Kingston against an invasion by the French. To thwart any eastward advance of the Morant Bay rebellion to Kingston, it was last staffed in 1865. The site that once protected Kingston Harbour is under the administration of the Jamaica National Heritage Trust.

After an earthquake in 1907, a spring formed in the mountains above the area. Spring water now feeds into the Rockfort Mineral Baths located at the site of the fort.

See also
 Port Royal

Notes

References

Further reading

External links
 "Remains of Spanish Fort - Rockfort, Kingston, Jamaica," National Library of Jamaica Digital Collection

Buildings and structures in Kingston, Jamaica
17th century in Jamaica
Forts in Jamaica